Anastasios Triantafyllou (born 11 January 1979) is a retired Greek football striker.

References

1979 births
Living people
OFI Crete F.C. players
Ionikos F.C. players
Ethnikos Asteras F.C. players
Diagoras F.C. players
AEL Kalloni F.C. players
A.O. Glyfada players
Episkopi F.C. players
Iraklis Psachna F.C. players
Super League Greece players
Association football forwards
Footballers from Heraklion
Greek footballers